The following is a list of songs available in Beat Saber.

References 

Lists of songs in music video games
Oculus VR
Virtual reality games